Joseph Earl McEwing (born October 19, 1972) is an American professional baseball coach and former utility player who is the bench coach for the St. Louis Cardinals of Major League Baseball (MLB). He played in MLB for the Cardinals, New York Mets, Kansas City Royals, and Houston Astros, and coached for the Chicago White Sox. Nicknamed "Super Joe", he was the prototypical utility player who could play any position on the field.

Early life
McEwing graduated from Bishop Egan High School in Fairless Hills, Pennsylvania in 1990. While in high school he played for both the basketball and baseball teams. He played college baseball at the County College of Morris in Randolph Township, New Jersey. During the 1991 season, he set a school record for single-season batting average, hitting .465. In 2001, the college retired his uniform number, six.

Professional baseball career
In 1998, he had a total of 51 doubles with Triple-A Memphis and Double-A Arkansas. His first full season in the majors was also his best. He also amassed a 25-game hitting streak, the fifth longest at that time by a rookie, and finished fifth in National League Rookie of the Year balloting.

McEwing became an immediate fan favorite because of his energy, hustle, and obvious love for the game. His nickname, Super Joe, referred to McEwing's positional versatility. During his rookie season, McEwing played every position on the field, except pitcher and catcher.

In his honor, St. Louis Cardinals fans created what was known as "Little Mac Land," in a play on words of the official "Big Mac Land" created in the upper deck of Busch Stadium for Mark McGwire. McEwing had a streak of 230 errorless games, which at one point was the longest such streak by an active major league outfielder. McEwing was often successful against Randy Johnson, so McEwing was nicknamed "Little Unit" (a reference to Johnson who was called "Big Unit").

During Spring training just before the start of the  season, he was traded to the New York Mets for Jesse Orosco. Cardinals manager Tony LaRussa admired McEwing so much that he requested a pair of the player's spikes upon the trade.

The Royals called McEwing up to the major leagues in April, when starting third baseman Mark Teahen went on the 15-day disabled list.

On March 30, he was sent to the Houston Astros by the Royals. In , he signed a minor league contract with the Boston Red Sox. On January 16, McEwing officially announced his retirement from baseball.

Post-playing career

In the 2008 season, McEwing started his baseball coaching career as the hitting coach for the Charlotte Knights. On November 3, 2008, he was named manager of the Winston-Salem Dash, the Class A affiliate for the Chicago White Sox, for the  season. During that season, Baseball America rated McEwing as the top managerial prospect in the South Atlantic League. McEwing was also named Manager of the Year for his work managing the Dash in 2009 and 2010.

McEwing was named manager of the Charlotte Knights, the White Sox Triple-A affiliate, for the 2011 season. In October 2011, McEwing was promoted to serve as the third base coach for the White Sox in 2012, serving under new manager Robin Ventura. Several managerial and coaching positions opened up shortly before the end of the 2011 season when then White Sox manager Ozzie Guillén announced that he would be leaving. McEwing was promoted from third base coach to bench coach for the 2017 season and continued to occupy that job until 2020 when the White Sox hired Miguel Cairo. On December 1, 2020, McEwing was named third base coach. 

On January 12, 2023, McEwing was hired by the St. Louis Cardinals as their bench coach.

McEwing and his wife Courtnie reside outside of Philadelphia with their children JD, Grace, and Ashlyn.

References

External links

2007 Player Statistics

1972 births
Living people
People from Bristol, Pennsylvania
St. Louis Cardinals players
New York Mets players
Kansas City Royals players
Houston Astros players
Chicago White Sox coaches
Pawtucket Red Sox players
Major League Baseball bench coaches
Major League Baseball infielders
Major League Baseball outfielders
Major League Baseball third base coaches
Baseball coaches from Pennsylvania
Baseball players from Pennsylvania
Morris Titans baseball players
Binghamton Mets players
Madison Hatters players
Arkansas Travelers players
St. Petersburg Cardinals players
Savannah Cardinals players
Memphis Redbirds players
Norfolk Tides players
Brooklyn Cyclones players
Omaha Royals players
Round Rock Express players
Águilas Cibaeñas players
American expatriate baseball players in the Dominican Republic
Minor league baseball managers